The men's 200 metres at the 2014 European Athletics Championships took place at the Letzigrund on 14 and 15 August.

The event was won by Great Britain's Adam Gemili in 19.98 seconds. Christophe Lemaitre of France, the defending champion, came second just as he did in the 100 metres, and Serhiy Smelyk of Ukraine came third.

Medalists

Records

Schedule

Results

Round 1
First 3 in each heat (Q) and 4 best performers (q) advance to the Semifinals.

Semifinals
First 3 in each heat (Q) and 2 best performers (q) advance to the Final.

Final
Wind: -1.6 m/s

References

Round 1 Results
Semifinal Results
Final Results

200
200 metres at the European Athletics Championships